Neenstetten is a town in the district of Alb-Donau in Baden-Württemberg in Germany.

Neenstetten is located on the southern edge of the Swabian Alb on a ridge above the Lonetal, about 18 kilometers north of Ulm and ten kilometers west of Langenau.

Neighboring communities
The municipality borders on Altheim (Alb), on the east by Börslingen, south to Bernstadt (Alb) and Holzkirch, and on the west by Weidenstetten.

History
Neenstetten was first mentioned in the year 1255.
The place belonged ecclesiastically initially to Weidenstetten. After the Reformation Neenstetten became a separate parish. The early Gothic choir tower plant received its characteristic onion dome to collapse of the Tower 1730. The nave dates from the 15th century ; it has wall paintings from that time.

Economy and Infrastructure
Neenstetten has from the 1950s agriculturally developed structured village for living and working community. In about 25 commercial farms currently about 500 workers are employed. There are also 15 part-time farms.

Companies
Gebr. Binder Metallwarenfabrik GmbH, Automotive

Education
In Neenstetten there is a kindergarten, but no school. Elementary school students go to primary school in Weidenstetten, two kilometers away. Main students attend the high school association in Altheim. Schools are in Langenau and Ulm.

Personalities

Gerhard Staib, since 1985 12 years of volunteer and 14 years of full-time mayor was (honorary citizen since June 21, 2011).
Eberhardt Renz (born in Neenstetten May 1, 1935) is a Protestant minister and was from 1994 to 2001 bishop of the Evangelical Lutheran Church in Württemberg.

Literature
Gerd Zillhardt (Hg.): The Thirty Years' War in contemporary representation. Hans Heberle "Zeytregister" (1618-1672). Records from the Ulmer territory. A contribution to history and historical understanding of the lower classes (research into the history of the city of Ulm, Vol. 13), Ulm 1975 (in German)

External links
 Commons: Neenstetten - collection of images, videos and audio files
 Wikisource: Neenstetten in the description of the Oberamts Ulm 1836 - sources and full texts
Website of the municipality Neenstetten
Photos from the 50s

References

Towns in Baden-Württemberg
Alb-Donau-Kreis
Württemberg